Cemetery Man is a 1994 comedy horror film directed by Michele Soavi and starring Rupert Everett, François Hadji-Lazaro and Anna Falchi. It was produced by Tilde Corsi, Gianni Romoli and Soavi and based on the graphic novel Dellamorte Dellamore by Tiziano Sclavi. Everett plays a beleaguered caretaker of a small Italian cemetery, who searches for love while defending himself from dead people who keep rising again.  It is an international co-production between Italy, France, and Germany.

Plot
Francesco Dellamorte (Rupert Everett) is the cemetery caretaker in the small Italian town of Buffalora. He lives in a ramshackle house on the premises, constantly surrounded by death, with only his mentally disabled assistant Gnaghi (François Hadji-Lazaro) for company. Young punks in town spread gossip that Dellamorte is impotent. His hobbies are reading outdated telephone directories, in which he crosses out the names of the deceased, and trying to assemble a puzzle shaped like a human skull. Gnaghi can speak only one word: "Gna."

The Latin inscription over the Buffalora Cemetery gate reads RESURRECTURIS ("For those who will rise again"), and indeed, Dellamorte has his hands full. Some people rise from their graves within seven nights following their deaths, as aggressive zombies. Dellamorte destroys these creatures, which he calls "Returners", before they overrun the town. Buffalora's mayor (Stefano Masciarelli) is so fixated on his reelection campaign that he doesn't register Dellamorte's pleas for an investigation. Being an outcast in the village and almost illiterate, Dellamorte doesn't want to lose his job. He opens up to his only friend, Franco, a municipal clerk, but doesn't file the paperwork to get assistance. He explains, "It's easier just to shoot them."

At a funeral, Dellamorte falls in love with the unnamed young widow (Anna Falchi) of a rich, elderly man. She is won over when Dellamorte tells her about the ossuary, which she adores. While consummating their relationship by her husband's grave, the undead husband arises and bites her. She seems to die from the bite, but the coroner claims it was a heart attack. Fearing the worst, Dellamorte stays near her corpse, and shoots her when she rises.

Gnaghi becomes infatuated with the mayor's teen daughter, Valentina (Fabiana Formica), but she is tragically decapitated in a motorcycle accident. Undeterred, Gnaghi digs up her reanimated head and begins an innocent romance. The relationship is cut short, however, when the mayor finds out and Valentina rips out his throat with her teeth. Dellamorte is forced to shoot her. The young widow also rises again, causing Dellamorte to believe she was not really a zombie when he first shot her, in which case it was he who killed her. He plummets into a depression and is visited by the leering figure of Death, who tells him to "Stop killing the dead" and suggests shooting the living instead.

Dellamorte encounters two more unnamed women, also played by Falchi. The first is an assistant to the new mayor. She confesses to Dellamorte that she is terrified of sexual penetration, so Dellamorte demands to have his penis removed by the local doctor. Refusing to do so, the doctor instead gives him an injection to induce temporary impotence. Meanwhile, the woman has been raped by and fallen in love with her employer. Having lost her phobia, she plans to marry her rapist and discards the cemetery man.

His grip on reality slipping, Dellamorte heads into town at night and shoots the young men who have made fun of him for years. He meets a third manifestation of the woman he loves but, upon learning she is a prostitute, kills her and two other women by setting their house on fire. His friend Franco (Anton Alexander) is accused of these murders after killing his wife and child, and attempts suicide. Dellamorte goes to visit Franco in the hospital. Sitting by the hospital bed, he casually murders a nun, a nurse, and a doctor. Franco claims to not recognize him. Distraught and confused, Dellamorte screams out a confession, but is ignored.

Gnaghi and Dellamorte pack up their car, and leave Buffalora. Gnaghi's head is injured when Dellamorte slams on the brakes. They get out of the vehicle and walk to the edge of the road, where it drops into a chasm. Gnaghi begins to seize and collapses to the ground. Dellamorte realizes that the rest of the world doesn't exist. Fearing his assistant is dying, he loads a gun with two dumdum bullets to finish them both off. However, Dellamorte cannot bring himself to shoot his friend. Gnaghi wakes up, drops the gun off the cliff, and asks to be taken home, speaking clearly for the first time. Dellamorte replies: "Gna." As the credits roll, the camera zooms out to reveal the two men standing in a snow globe.

Cast
 Rupert Everett as Francesco Dellamorte
 François Hadji-Lazaro as Gnaghi
 Anna Falchi as She
 Mickey Knox as Marshall Straniero
 Anton Alexander as Franco
 Fabiana Formica as Valentina Scanarotti
 Clive Riche as Dr. Vercesi
 Stefano Masciarelli as Mayor Scanarotti
 Alessandro Zamattio as Claudio
 Katja Anton as Claudio's girlfriend
 Barbara Cupisti as Magda
 Patrizia Punzo as Claudio's mother
 Renato Doris as She's husband
 Derek Jacobi: Death

Release

Cemetery Man was first released in 1994. American distributor October Films changed its title to Cemetery Man and released it on April 26, 1996.

Anchor Bay Entertainment released the film on R1 DVD in 2006 under the American title Cemetery Man.

Reception
Rotten Tomatoes, a review aggregator, reports that 61% of 31 surveyed critics gave the film a positive review; the average rating is 6.10/10. The site's consensus reads: "Cemetery Man will frustrate viewers seeking narrative cohesion or coherence, but this surreal brand of humor and horror should satisfy B-movie fans in the mood for quirk". Stephen Holden of The New York Times wrote that the film is unconventional but becomes repetitive as Everett dispatches shallow metaphors for fascism.  Bob Stephens of The San Francisco Examiner wrote that the film suffers from an uneven tone but "is redeemed by his uncommon visual imagination".  Deborah Young of Variety wrote, "A hip, offbeat horror item floating on a bed of dark philosophy, Dellamorte Dellamore is a deceptively easy genre picture with hidden depths."  Mick LaSalle of the San Francisco Chronicle wrote, "It aims high and misses, but it does hold interest with visual flash, wry humor and a couple of sex scenes that can make steam come out of your ears."  In more modern reviews, Bloody Disgusting rated it 5/5 stars and called it "one of the greatest cult films of the last twenty years".  Joshua Siebalt of Dread Central rated it 4/5 stars and wrote that Soavi's direction and film's humor make it different and memorable.

Director Martin Scorsese called Dellamorte Dellamore one of the best Italian films of the 1990s.

Sequel
In January 2011, Fangoria reported that director Michele Soavi was planning a sequel. Soavi planned to shoot the film sometime near the end of 2011 or early 2012.

References

Footnotes

Sources

External links
 
 
 

1994 films
1990s comedy horror films
French comedy horror films
French independent films
German comedy horror films
German independent films
German zombie films
Italian comedy horror films
Italian independent films
English-language French films
English-language German films
English-language Italian films
Zombie comedy films
German splatter films
Italian splatter films
French supernatural horror films
Italian supernatural horror films
German supernatural horror films
Supernatural comedy films
Films based on horror novels
Films based on Italian novels
Films directed by Michele Soavi
Films scored by Manuel De Sica
Fictional undertakers
Films set in cemeteries
Italian zombie films
Films set in Lombardy
1990s exploitation films
1990s French films
1990s German films